PSRC may refer to:

Parastatal Sector Reform Commission, a part of the Tanzanian government
Puget Sound Regional Council, a regional planning organization in the U.S. state of Washington